The Hop, also known as the Milwaukee Streetcar, is a modern streetcar system in Milwaukee, Wisconsin. The  initial line connects the Milwaukee Intermodal Station and Downtown to the Lower East Side and Historic Third Ward neighborhoods. A  Lakefront branch, to the proposed "Couture" high-rise development, has been mostly constructed, but is not projected to open until late 2022. The system is owned by the city and operated by Transdev.

Construction of the system began in late 2016 and was completed in summer 2018. Service to the public began on November 2, 2018.

Background
In 1860, Milwaukee opened the first line of its original streetcar system using horse-drawn streetcars. The system continued to grow in the late 19th century and into the early 20th century, culminating in a large network of electric streetcar lines.

After World War II, the federal government invested heavily in the development of an interconnected interstate highway system, and raised taxes on private railway and streetcar operators. This stimulated massive urban sprawl and car dependency to the detriment of public transport systems. Commenting on this trend, philosopher and planner Lewis Mumford said when the Interstate Highway Act passed that more damage would be done to American cities in the next 10 years than all the bombing the Germans did to European cities during World War II. On March 2, 1958, the city's last streetcar route was closed.

Route description
The northern terminus of the M-Line is Burns Commons (Ogden Avenue at Prospect Avenue). From there, the line follows Ogden Avenue in both directions to Jackson Street, turns west on Kilbourn Avenue, then splits; southbound streetcars follow N. Broadway, while northbound streetcars follow N. Milwaukee Street.  later, two-way running resumes at E. St. Paul Avenue. After crossing the Milwaukee River, the line then follows W. St. Paul Avenue in both directions to N. 4th Street, terminating at the Milwaukee Intermodal Station. Kiosks displaying real-time arrival times are installed at the Intermodal Station, Cathedral Square, and Burns Commons stations.

The future L-Line is expected to use the tracks of the M-Line along Milwaukee Street and Broadway to make a loop around downtown, then branch to N. Lincoln Memorial Dr. via E. Michigan St. and E. Clybourn Street. By June 2018, it had been constructed except for its outermost section, where delays to the start of work on The Couture prevented finishing construction. In fall 2018 it was expected to commence service in late 2020.

Of the  length of the M-Line,  is not equipped with overhead wires. The streetcars cover these sections along Kilbourn Avenue and Jackson Street powered only by their batteries. About two-thirds of the track sections that will be brought into use later for the L-Line will also be unwired.

History

Funding and approval 
The total cost to construct the streetcar was estimated in 2015 to be US$123.9 million (equivalent to $ million in ). The project was approved by the Milwaukee Common Council on January 21, 2015, and upheld on February 10, 2015, by a vote of 10 to 5. In October 2015, the project received a federal grant which will cover approximately half the cost of a spur to the lakefront.

Initial route plans had streetcars run only northbound on Van Buren Street and only southbound on Jackson Street. In February 2016, this split was removed to reduce utility relocation costs.

In mid-April 2016, the city invited bids for the construction of the project's first phase, with a June 1 due date for proposals. At that time, it was estimated that construction could begin in late summer or early fall 2016 and be completed in 2018.

Construction and testing

On August 19, 2016, Omaha contractor Kiewit Infrastructure was announced as the winning bidder for the contract to construct the line and carhouse. In February 2017, it was announced that track construction was projected to begin in April that year, which it did. Work on utility relocation relating to the project had already started in 2016, as did construction of the maintenance facility for the line. Installation of the tracks along the route began in May 2017. By March 2018, more than 90% of the track had been installed along the initial line.

In mid-2017, the city signed a contract with Transdev to operate and maintain the streetcar system for at least five years. The first test trip covering the entire line under power was made on the night of June 18/19, 2018. Training of operators also began that month.

Naming rights

In October 2017, it was announced that a 12-year sponsorship deal, including naming rights, had been reached between the Potawatomi Native American community and the city of Milwaukee. Under the agreement, the Milwaukee Streetcar was formally renamed "The Hop, presented by Potawatomi Hotel & Casino" – The Hop, for short – in exchange for $10 million in funding from the Potawatomi. These corporate sponsorship funds would also allow all Hop service to be free for the first year, city officials said.

Future
The L-line lakefront loop was expected to commence service in 2020. However the lakefront station will be integrated with a real estate development whose start of construction has been delayed to 2021. Two additional extensions are being planned: one north past Fiserv Forum into Bronzeville and the second as a new branch from the Third Ward and extending south to Walker's Point.  A portion of the northerly M-line extension was originally planned to be operational in time for the 2020 Democratic National Convention. For political reasons, construction approval was bundled with planning approval for the Bronzeville and Walker's Point extensions; controversy over the location of the Walker's Point terminal scuttled approval for all three proposals. Since the  2020 Democratic National Convention ultimately became a virtual event due to the COVID-19 crisis, the short term need for the partial extension became moot.

The City of Milwaukee has applied for a TIGER Grant to gain federal funds to fund 50% of the system's extension up 4th Street towards the new Fiserv Forum and the Bronzeville neighborhood.

Operations
The line is operated by Transdev, under contract to the city of Milwaukee, the streetcar system's owner. The contract goes through December 2023, covering the first five years of in-service operation, with an option for a five-year extension.

Hop service runs seven days a week, from 5 a.m. to midnight Monday to Friday, 7 a.m. to midnight Saturdays, and 7 a.m. to 10 p.m. Sundays. Fare-free service originally planned to end after one year is still in effect due to delays in procuring a fare sale/validation system. The system's car house, its storage and maintenance facility, is on Vel R. Phillips Avenue (4th Street), under an elevated section of the I-794 freeway.

Rolling stock

On April 6, 2015, the city invited bids for the supply of four streetcars, with the issuing of a request for proposals to interested manufacturers. In November 2015, the city awarded an $18.6-million contract to Brookville Equipment Corporation to build four "Liberty" model streetcars for Milwaukee. A fifth car was added to the order later, to expand the fleet sufficiently to be able to serve the future Lakefront extension.

The city specified that the streetcars be capable of operating in service using only battery power part of the time, because almost one third of the line is not equipped with overhead wires; the batteries are charged when the vehicles are on the wired portions of the line. The sections that will be operated on battery power only are along Kilbourn Avenue and Jackson Street. All other parts of the line have overhead wires, although a portion of the future branch to the Lakefront area is also planned to be unwired.

The first of the five vehicles arrived in Milwaukee from Brookville on March 26, 2018, and made the first test run over a short section of the line on April 11. On May 14, 2018, the second streetcar was delivered, followed by the third on July 26. The fifth and final car on order was delivered on September 7, 2018.

Stations

Ridership

The busiest day for The Hop was July 13, 2019 with 9,000 riders.

See also
 Milwaukee County Transit System
 Streetcars in North America
 The Milwaukee Electric Railway and Light Company – the primary operator of streetcar service in Milwaukee from 1890 to 1958
 Chicago North Shore and Milwaukee Railroad – an interurban railway that operated a local streetcar service in Milwaukee from 1907 to 1951
 List of bus transit systems in the United States
 List of rail transit systems in the United States
 List of intercity bus stops in Wisconsin
 Waukesha Metro Transit
 Washington County Commuter Express
 Hiawatha Service

References

External links

The Hop Streetcar
 

Streetcars in Wisconsin
Transportation in Milwaukee
Railway lines opened in 2018
Electric railways in Wisconsin
2018 establishments in Wisconsin
750 V DC railway electrification